The Villa Marguerite or Château Marguerite is a mansion in Neussargues-Moissac in the Cantal department in the Auvergne region of France.

History

The Villa Marguerite is a late 19th-century French mansion, the present form of which is due to its second owner, Maurice Guibal, a former mayor of Murat, Cantal, who named it after his daughter. Villa Marguerite is a distinctive landmark of Neussargues-Moissac and often features on post cards of the town.

Notes and references 

Buildings and structures in Cantal
Châteaux in Cantal
Houses completed in the 19th century
Villas in France
19th-century architecture in France